Satanones(s) is a village and petty former princely state on Saurashtra peninsula in Gujarat, western India.

History
Satanones was a princely state under Kamliya kathi (Kamaliyawad) chieftain. 

It had a population of 240 in 1901, yielding a state revenue of 1200 Rupees (mostly from land; 1903-4) and paying 109 Rupees tribute to Junagadh State.

During the British Raj, the petty state in Gohelwar prant was under the colonial Eastern Kathiawar Agency.

External links
 Imperial Gazetteer on DSAL.UChicago - Kathiawar

Princely states of Gujarat